Adolfo Barán Flis  (born 22 November 1961 in Montevideo) is a former Uruguayan footballer.

Club career
Barán was the top goal scorer in the 1990 Primera Division Uruguaya season, with 13 goals.

International career
Barán made four appearances for the senior Uruguay national football team from 1987 to 1989.

References

1961 births
Living people
Uruguayan footballers
Uruguay under-20 international footballers
Uruguay international footballers
Uruguayan expatriate footballers
C.A. Bella Vista players
Peñarol players
Defensor Sporting players
Racing Club de Montevideo players
Cúcuta Deportivo footballers
Independiente Santa Fe footballers
Everton de Viña del Mar footballers
Real C.D. España players
Expatriate footballers in Chile
Expatriate footballers in Colombia
Expatriate footballers in Honduras
Uruguayan Primera División players
Categoría Primera A players
Liga Nacional de Fútbol Profesional de Honduras players
Footballers from Montevideo
Association football forwards
C.A. Rentistas managers